The flame-crowned flowerpecker (Dicaeum kampalili) is a species of bird in the family Dicaeidae. It is endemic to Mindanao in the Philippines. The yellow-crowned flowerpecker (Dicaeum anthonyi), which is endemic to Luzon, was formerly considered conspecific.

Description and taxonomy 
EBird describes the bird as "A tiny bird of mossy montane forest and edge. Male has glossy black upperparts and pale underparts, whiter on the throat. Races differ. Mindanao birds are orange-red under the base of the tail and on the crown. Similar to Bicolored flowerpecker, but male Flame-crowned has a bright crown patch and female has a yellowish belly. Voice includes a high-pitched descending whistle and a sharp “tsik!”

Exhibits sexual dimorphism in which males have the eponymous flame orange crown and vent while females are much more dull and have uniform olive color and does not the black upperparts

It is seen feeding on flowering and fruiting trees.

Habitat and conservation status 
It inhabits tropic moist montane forest at mossy forest above 1,300 meters above sea level.

IUCN has assessed this bird as least-concern  with its population being estimated as 10,000 to 19,999 mature individuals. While not considered threatened, it is still thought to be declining.  Forest loss is a threat especially in its lower altitude limits which are more prone to legal and illegal logging, mining and conversion into farmland.

It is recommended to investigate potential threats and quantify more precisely the population size of the species. Protect areas of suitable habitat and safeguard against deforestation.

References

flame-crowned flowerpecker
Endemic birds of the Philippines
Birds of Mindanao
flame-crowned flowerpecker